Garlic oil is the volatile oil derived from garlic. It is usually prepared using steam distillation and can also be produced via distillation using ether. It is used in cooking and as a seasoning, a nutritional supplement, and also as an insecticide.

Preparation
Garlic oil is typically prepared using steam distillation, where crushed garlic is steamed with the resultant condensation containing the oil. Garlic oil contains volatile sulfur compounds such as diallyl disulfide, a 60% constituent of the oil. Steam-distilled garlic oil typically has a pungent and disagreeable odor and a brownish-yellow color. Its odor has been attributed to the presence of diallyl disulfide. To produce around 1 gram of pure steam-distilled garlic oil, around 500 grams of garlic is required. Undiluted garlic oil has 900 times the strength of fresh garlic, and 200 times the strength of dehydrated garlic.

Ether can also be used to extract garlic oil. A type of garlic oil involves soaking diced or crushed garlic in vegetable oil, but this is not pure garlic oil; rather it is a garlic-infused oil.

Uses
Garlic oil is used as a nutritional supplement, and is sometimes marketed in the form of capsules, which may be diluted with other ingredients. Some commercial preparations are produced with various levels of dilution, such as a preparation that contains 10% garlic oil. Herbal folklore holds that garlic oil has antifungal and antibiotic properties, but there is insufficient clinical research confirming such effects. It is also sold in health food stores as a digestive aid. 

It can be used as an insecticide, diluted with water and sprayed on plants.

Stabilized garlic flavor blend is a proprietary mixture of dehydrated garlic powder infused with garlic oil, which increases the flavor of the garlic powder.

Potential adverse effects
Common adverse effects of consuming garlic, garlic oil, and garlic supplements are breath and body odor, abdominal pain, nausea, vomiting, and other symptoms of gastrointestinal disorders. Garlic oil consumption may have anticoagulant effects in some people, causing bleeding, and may interfere with prescription drugs.

Health research
Garlic oil has been assessed in laboratory and preliminary clinical research for its potential to affect human health, with inconclusive results, as of 2016.

Garlic-flavored oil

Garlic-flavored oil is produced and used for cooking and seasoning purposes, and is sometimes used as an ingredient in seasoning mixtures. This differs from essential garlic oil, and typically involves the use of chopped, macerated or crushed garlic placed in various vegetable oils to flavor the oil.

See also
 Garlic sauce
 List of essential oils
 List of garlic dishes

References

Garlic
Essential oils
Spices